|}
Daniel Murray Leo (born 14 August 1950) is a former Australian politician. He was the Labor member for Nhulunbuy in the Northern Territory Legislative Assembly from 1980 to 1990.

References

1950 births
Living people
Members of the Northern Territory Legislative Assembly
Australian Labor Party members of the Northern Territory Legislative Assembly